Catherine McGowan AO (born 29 November 1953) is a former Australian politician who was the independent MP for the rural Victorian seat of Indi from the 2013 federal election, when she defeated Liberal MP Sophie Mirabella, until her retirement before the 2019 federal election.

In 2004 she was made an Officer of the Order of Australia "for service to the community through raising awareness of and stimulating debate about issues affecting women in regional, rural and remote areas." McGowan was also a recipient of the Centenary Medal in 2001.

McGowan has a Masters Degree in Applied Science in Agricultural and Rural Development from the University of Western Sydney.

Politics

Early politics and lobbyist work
McGowan worked as a staffer for Indi's Liberal MP Ewen Cameron during the late 1970s and early 1980s. McGowan also worked as a regional councillor for the Victorian Farmers' Federation and is a former President of Australian Women in Agriculture.

Member for Indi
McGowan ran as an independent for the Division of Indi at the 2013 Australian federal election, against the Liberal incumbent Sophie Mirabella.  The seat had long been believed to be a conservative stronghold; it had been held by a conservative party for all but nine years since Federation, and without interruption since 1931.  However, a number of area residents felt Mirabella had taken them for granted.  They formed a grassroots organisation, Voices for Indi, that eventually decided to draft an independent to run against Mirabella.  After numerous prominent locals turned down the offer, McGowan finally accepted. After eleven days of counting, on 18 September, Mirabella conceded defeat and McGowan claimed victory, winning the seat with a final margin of 431 votes, a two-candidate preferred vote of 50.25 percent. Mirabella was the only Liberal incumbent to lose her seat at the 2013 election. The ABC's Barrie Cassidy described McGowan's candidacy as "a warning to the occupants of safe seats everywhere on both sides of politics."

It was claimed in October 2014 that 20 McGowan supporters who formerly lived in Indi changed their electoral roll details back to Indi. The Commonwealth Department of Public Prosecutions pursued charges against two young voters. Their defence lawyers successfully argued the charges were "scurrilous" and that they had followed the Australian Electoral Commission's published advice in enrolling at their home address; on 5 April 2016 a Melbourne Magistrate dismissed all charges against the two voters and ordered the Crown to pay their court costs.

Mirabella gained Liberal party preselection in late June 2015 to run for Indi in the 2016 federal election, However, McGowan retained Indi against Mirabella with an increased 54.8% (+4.6) two-candidate-preferred vote. Mirabella conceded to McGowan on 3 July 2016. Notably, the Liberal two-party-preferred vote in a "traditional" two-party contest against Labor was reduced to 54.4% (–4.7) against Labor's 45.6% (+4.7), a marginal two-party result not seen since the 1929 election.

McGowan gave the Coalition government confidence and supply support in the event of a hung parliament.

In the lead-up to the 2016 Federal election, McGowan was present at a function at a Benalla nursing home along with Sophie Mirabella. Both were candidates for the Division of Indi. It was subsequently reported on 20 April 2016 by journalist Libby Price in the Benalla Ensign that Mirabella had pushed McGowan at this meeting. McGowan was interviewed soon after the event and refused to confirm or deny the allegation. She was interviewed by The Border Mail and refused on four occasions to answer as to whether she had been pushed or not. The Benalla Ensign issued an apology on 26 October 2016 and stated that Mirabella did not push McGowan. Mirabella launched defamation proceedings against the Benalla Ensign and its editor Libby Price. The case was heard in the Victorian County Court in Wangaratta in early May 2018. McGowan was called as a witness in the case and gave evidence that Mirabella did not push her. The court found in favour of Mirabella that she had been defamed by the Benalla Ensign and its editor Libby Price.

On 14 January 2019 McGowan announced she would not be recontesting Indi at the next election. On 18 May 2019, her preferred independent candidate, Helen Haines, claimed victory in the federal election.

See also
 List of grassroots political engagement groups in Australia
 Voices for Indi

References

Further reading

External links
 CathyMcGowan.com.au official site
 Cathy McGowan they vote for YOU
 

 

1953 births
Living people
Australian consultants
Australian schoolteachers
Independent members of the Parliament of Australia
Members of the Australian House of Representatives for Indi
Members of the Australian House of Representatives
Monash University alumni
Officers of the Order of Australia
Recipients of the Centenary Medal
University of Melbourne alumni
Western Sydney University alumni
Women members of the Australian House of Representatives
21st-century Australian politicians
21st-century Australian women politicians
People from Albury, New South Wales